Michael David Reeve FBA (11 January 1943) is a British classicist and Professor Emeritus at Cambridge University. One of the foremost  textual scholars of his generation, he has published widely on the transmission of Latin and Greek texts. He served as the eighth Kennedy Professor of Latin.

Career
Reeve was educated at King Edward's School, Birmingham and went on to study at Balliol College, Oxford. He was appointed a lecturer at the University of Oxford and made a fellow of Exeter College, Oxford in 1966. He remained in this position until 1984, when he was appointed Kennedy Professor of Latin at Cambridge University. He also became a fellow of Pembroke College, Cambridge. In 1984, he was elected Fellow of the British Academy. In 2006, Reeve retired from his teaching duties. On 12 February 2014, Reeve was elected to the Accademia Ambrosiana (Veneranda Biblioteca Ambrosiana, Milan, Italy) in the Class of Greek and Latin Studies. In 2017, he was elected 'Socio Straniero' (i.e. Foreign Fellow) of the Accademia Nazionale dei Lincei (Rome, Italy).

Selected publications
Longus, Daphnis et Chloe, Leipzig, Leipzig, B. G. Teubner (Bibliotheca Teubneriana), 1982 (2nd ed. Leipzig, B. G. Teubner (Bibliotheca Teubneriana), 1986; 3rd ed. München – Leipzig, K. G. Saur (Bibliotheca Teubneriana), 1994)
M. Tullii Ciceronis Scripta quae manserunt omnia, 7: Oratio Pro P. Quinctio, Stuttgart – Leipzig, B. G. Teubner (Bibliotheca Teubneriana), 1992
Vegetius, Epitoma rei militaris, Oxford, The Clarendon Press (Scriptorum classicorum bibliotheca Oxoniensis), 2004
M. Tullii Ciceronis Scripta quae manserunt omnia, 24: Oratio de provinciis consularibus; Oratio pro L. Cornelio Balbo, Berlin – New York, W. De Gruyter (Bibliotheca Teubneriana), 2007 [ed. Tadeusz Maslowski, preface by M. D. Reeve]
Geoffrey of Monmouth, The History of the Kings of Britain, with N. Wright, Woodbridge, Boydell and Brewer, 2007
Manuscripts and Methods. Essays on Editing and Transmission, Roma, Edizioni di Storia e Letteratura (Storia e Letteratura, 270), 2011

References

Works Cited
Hunter, R. and Oakley, S.P. (2015) Latin Literature and its Transmission (Cambridge)

Members of the University of Cambridge faculty of classics
People educated at King Edward's School, Birmingham
1943 births
British Latinists
Fellows of Exeter College, Oxford
Fellows of the British Academy
Living people
Kennedy Professors of Latin